Diggerland is the name of theme parks inspired by diggers and JCBs. There are four theme parks in England, and one in the United States. Diggerland is part of the H.E Services Group and Allsafety Limited.

Locations 
There are four Diggerland theme parks in the United Kingdom located in Strood in Kent, Langley Park in County Durham, Cullompton in Devon and Castleford in West Yorkshire. In 2015 it was announced that Diggerland would open their fifth UK park in Evesham, Worcestershire, but this was delayed indefinitely in 2017.

Diggerland had a temporary park in Dubai during the summer of 2005. Their 2006 plan to expand to Richmond, Virginia in the United States was stalled out by the Great Recession.

Diggerland expanded into the United States and opened a park in West Berlin, New Jersey in 2014.

Events 
Racing events happen between March and October, because they need to be completed in daylight hours. Dumper Racing is held on a monthly basis.

Diggerland also has a team, The Dancing Diggers, which operates every other year and features large diggers doing stunts. In 2017, they performed at several county fairs, including the Royal Bath and West Country Show.

References

External links 
 Diggerland UK
 Diggerland USA

Amusement parks in England
Tourist attractions in County Durham
Tourist attractions in Devon
Tourist attractions in Kent
Tourist attractions in West Yorkshire
2000 establishments in England
Amusement parks in New Jersey
Tourist attractions in Camden County, New Jersey
Berlin Township, New Jersey